Lygia Pape (7 April 1927 – 3 May 2004) was a Brazilian visual artist, sculptor, engraver, and filmmaker, who was a key figure in the Concrete movement and a later co-founder of the Neo-Concrete Movement in Brazil during the 1950s and 1960s. Along with Hélio Oiticica and Lygia Clark, she was an important artist in the expansion of contemporary art in Brazil and pushed geometric art to include aspects of interaction and to engage with ethical and political themes.

Early life and career
Lygia Pape was born on 7 April 1927 in Nova Friburgo, Brazil. Pape studied philosophy at the Universidade Federal do Rio de Janeiro (UFTJ).  Afterwards, she received an informal training in fine arts, and studied with Fayga Ostrower at the Museum of Modern Art, Rio de Janeiro.

Concrete Art
By the age of 20, Pape had joined the concrete art movement. The term "concrete art" was coined by the Dutch artist Theo van Doesburg in 1930.

The Tecelares Series
In the 1950s, Pape created her Tecelares Series. The Tecelares wood prints were originally seen purely as works of Concrete art because of their precise and geometric aesthetic. The woodblock prints are minimalistic; they feature planes of black ink and thin lines that reveal the white rice paper underneath. The production of the series seems straightforward: Pape incised the entire surface of the woodblock with thin lines, adding several non-orthogonal lines to create the appearance of distinct planes and the suggestion of movement and space in a work that would be otherwise flat and static. 
In Tecelares, Lygia Pape used "weaving" as a metaphor to evoke handiwork and a connection to Brazil's traditional and indigenous culture. Pape spoke of how indigenous Brazilian cultures had used geometry to express fundamental concepts, like the concept of collective identity.  Thus, for Lygia Pape, geometry didn't represent industry or mechanization, but rather it expressed a transcendent idiom. Instead of using a gridded and rigid composition, Pape blended natural and organic patterns with incised lines that are intertwined to "warp and weft." Pape used simple materials, crafted minimally by her own hands to incorporate expression into a work that is not expressionistic.

Sem Titulo [Untitled] (1959)
This 1959 artwork in the Tecelares series, takes the same woodblock carving technique and is incised by thin parallel lines which are disrupted by the non-orthogonal lines that cut across the print. The two horizontally oriented lines that cut across the print break up the continuity of the parallel lines, creating the illusion of a separate plain and thus, space.

Although Pape used a ruled edge and a compass to create the lines in Sem Título [Untitled] (1959), there are slight variations in the width of the lines, revealing that a hand rather than a machine made the forms. Additionally, the rice paper's delicacy had absorbed the ink, creating imprecise edges. The black ink of the woodprint's background also reveals the natural wood grain of the block print as one can see the porous marks of the wood between the incised lines on the print. So despite the woodprint's originally Concrete identity, Sem Título [Untitled] (1959), is now understood as a transitional piece from the Concrete movement into the Neo-Concrete, as it is infused with non-mechanical and "handmade" qualities that seem more expressive than mechanistic.

 , 1959
 , 1959

Sem Titulo [Untitled] (1960)
The 1960s version of Tecelares is even more organic and expressive than the earlier 1959 version. The print shows the grain of the woodblock even more overtly in the bottom portion of the print, while the top portion remains relatively muted. As in the other prints in this series, Sem Título [Untitled] (1960) is cut by diagonal lines that disrupt the continuity of the horizontal wood grain pattern, creating movement and distinct planes in the artwork, though they are considerably more subtle than the 1959 Sem Título [Untitled] print of the same series. Also similar to the 1959 print, the 1960 print has the same imprecise quality created by the feathering of the ink on the rice paper. It also has a very organic quality, which is produced through the patterns and swirls of the wood grain. Because of this organic pattern, this print seems to overtly oppose the mechanic properties associated with Concrete art.

 , 1960

Grupo Frente 
In 1952, at the age of 25, Pape met fellow Brazilian artists Hélio Oiticica, Ivan Serpa, and Aluísio Carvão. Together the quartet formed the Grupo Frente. The Grupo Frente organized a subtle movement that rejected the national painting style of Brazil. Grupo Frente began exploring abstract and concrete art styles that distanced themselves from overly political art. The group was united by their desire to reject modern Brazilian art. Grupo Frente was revolutionary for their studies in line, form, and color. Grupo Frente organized two solo exhibitions. Their first exhibition was at the Ibeu gallery in Rio in 1954, under the artist guidance of Ferreira Gullar. Their second exhibition was in 1955 at the Museum of Modern Art in Rio. Both exhibits highlighted non-traditional use of line, geometric shapes and color.

Neo-Concrete Movement 
After her involvement with the Grupo Frente Concrete artists, Pape transitioned into the short wave of Neo-Concrete art.

As scholar Adele Nelson suggested, the Grupo Ruptura artist Waldemar Cordeiro and the Grupo Frente Ferreira Gullar had a debate on each other’s “inadequate and overzealous rigor in their respective approaches to geometric abstraction”, which promoted and inspired the former members of Grupo Frente including Lygia Pape to initiate the Neo-Concrete movement in 1959. Neo-Concrete Movement advocates for a more expressive and corporeal viewing experience than the “overly rational” art-making approach embraced by Grupo Ruptura.

In 1959 Pape was a signatory of the Neo-Concrete Manifesto, along with Lygia Clark and Helio Oiticica.  In explaining her approach, Lygia Pape said:

Pape specifically during her Neo-Concrete period was interested in the “proposal to ‘live the body.’” This phrase indicates Pape’s interest in how the physical body acts as our mediator for all sensual experiences. Pape sought to explore this idea of the body’s relation in space by creating multi-sensorial experiences in her artwork.

Livro da Criacao [Book of Creation], (1959)
The sculpture/book/poem Livro da Criacao [Book of Creation] is emblematic of the early Neo-Concrete works. The work consists of sixteen unbound cardboard "pages". The pages are 12 x 12 inches each and feature abstract images that are supposed to signify a significant moment in the creation of the world, such as the recession of water, the discovery of fire and agriculture, hunting, and navigation. As a Neo-concrete artist, Lygia Pape's Livro da Criacao [Book of Creation] synthesizes reason and emotion. The participant is meant to have a phenomenological experience by handling the book. Each reading of the work might be different based on the individual's experiences. As Lygia Pape noted, "It's important to say that there are two plausible readings: for me it is the book of the creation of the world, but for others it can be the book of "creation." Through each person's experiences, there is a process of open structure through which each structure can generate its own reading."

Later career
Later on in the 1960s and 1970s, Pape produced more videos and installations using sarcastic and critical metaphors against the Brazilian dictatorship. From the 1980s onward, these metaphors became more subtle.

Among the videos produced in this period, the seminal film made in 1975 by Pape, Eat Me, has evoked the interest in exploring the attraction and repulsion in gender and sexuality. The sensual movements of a female and a male mouth are presented in slow motion, which is referred to as an implication of a vagina as well as the actions of “sucking and expelling objects”, according to Claudia Calirman. Although Pape persisted that this work should not be viewed as a thesis, the film reveals sexism by “implicating the viewer in the objectification of women”.

Her artwork worked as a vehicle for existential, sensorial, and psychological life experiences, much of it based in geometry and relying on both the intellectual and physical participation of the viewer. A 1967 work, O Ovo, had installation participants crawl inside a cube-shaped structure of wooden boards covered in plastic film, and then push through the film to simulate the act of being born.

From 1972 to 1985, Pape taught semiotics at the School of Architecture at the Universidade Santa Úrsula in Rio de Janeiro, and was appointed professor in the School of Fine Arts of the Universidade Federal do Rio de Janeiro in 1983 as well. In 1980 she received a masters degree in philosophy from the Federal University of Rio de Janeiro. In her teaching, Pape introduced her mostly middle and upper class students to the informal architecture of Rio de Janeiro's favelas, with particular focus on Maré. In her films, photography, and teaching of the 1970s and 1980s, Pape sought to investigate architectural forms and sociability of urban space in Rio de Janeiro.

Pape’s first retrospective exhibition was held in 2000, with a close focus on her print practice in chronological delineation. She viewed these works as “a generative source of her fifty-plus years of artistic creation”. When reinterpreting these artworks, Pape also adopted the form of photography with no surprise.

The Ttéias series
Of all of Pape's works, Ttéias (1979) is perhaps most emblematic of her artistic process. The Ttéias was first conceived in 1979, but it was not until the 1990s that it was produced in full scale. In 1978 Lygia Pape began to experiment arranging and rearranging metallic strings together with her students at the Parque Lage Gardens in Rio de Janeiro. Pape invented the word "Ttéias", which is a pun based on the Portuguese word for "web" ("teia") and for "a person or thing of grace" ("teteia"). This series consists of an immersive staging of semi-transparent prisms, which were created using gold thread. This piece blends realism and imaginary art, allowing the viewer to interperate Ttéias by walking through it.

Death
Pape died on 3 May 2004 in Rio de Janeiro at age of 77.

Select exhibitions
 1998 Museum of Contemporary Art, Los Angeles
 2000 CAMJAP Lisbon
 2000 Artur Barrio, Antonio Manuel, Lygia Pape, Museu Serralves, Porto 
 2002 steirischer herbst, Graz
 2002 Brazil: Body and Soul, Solomon R. Guggenheim Museum, New York 
 2003 Galerie der Stadt Sindelfingen
 2003 50. Biennale di Venezia
 2003 Galeria Fortes Vilaça, São Paulo
 2004 Museu de Arte Moderna, São Paulo
 2004 Haus der Kunst, Munich
 2004 Le Magasin, Grenoble
 2005 Museum of Contemporary Art, Chicago
 2005 Museum of Contemporary Art, Thessaloniki
 2005 Quarter, Florence
 2005 Museum für Gegenwartskunst, Siegen
 2006 Bronx Museum of the Arts
 2006 Museu de Arte Moderna, São Paulo
 2006 Museu de Arte Moderna, Rio de Janeiro
 2006 1 Galeria Graca Brandao, Porto
 2006 Barbican Centre, London
 2007 Instituto Tomie Ohtake, São Paulo
 2007 Museu de Arte Moderna, Rio de Janeiro
 2008 Kunsthalle Kiel
 2008 Contemporary Brazilian Art Museum of Contemporary Art, Tokyo
 2008 Museu de Arte Moderna, Rio de Janeiro
 2009 Making Worlds, 53rd Biennale di Venezia, Venice
 2009 Folder Museum of Modern Art, New York
 2011 Lygia Pape: Magnetized Space, Serpentine Galleries, London
 2011 Museo Nacional Centro de Arte Reina Sofía, Madrid
 2017 Lygia Pape: A Multitude of Forms, Metropolitan Museum of Art, New York 
 2018 Lygia Pape: Ttéia 1,C, Moderna Museet, Stockholm
 2022 Lygia Pape. The Skin of ALL, Kunstsammlung Nordrhein-Westfalen, Düsseldorf

Art market and estate
Pape did not work with a commercial gallery until later in life.

Projeto Lygia Pape, the artist's estate, was founded by the artist before her death in 2004 and is administered by her daughter Paula Pape. In 2017, Paula Pape filed a suit in the United States District Court for the Southern District of New York against LG Electronics, several vendors of its mobile phones and Getty Images Korea alleging an infringement of copyright of her mother's 2003 sculpture TtEia 1, C in packaging materials, advertising and promotions for the K20 V mobile phone.

References

External links
 Official website
 Lygia Pape at Venice Biennale 2009

1927 births
2004 deaths
People from Nova Friburgo
Brazilian contemporary artists
20th-century Brazilian women artists